Elections for Runnymede Borough Council took place on 3 May 2018 alongside nationwide local elections. A third of the council was up for election, and the Conservatives retained control. Labour won their first seat on the council for over 20 years.

Election results

After the election, the composition of the council was:
Conservative: 33
Runnymede Independent Residents' Group: 6
Independent: 2
Labour: 1

Ward results

Addlestone Bourneside

Addlestone North

Chertsey Meads

Chertsey South and Row Town

Chertsey St Ann's

Egham Hythe

Egham Town

Englefield Green East

Englefield Green West

Foxhills

New Haw

Thorpe

Virginia Water

Woodham

References

Runnymede Borough Council elections
2018 English local elections
May 2018 events in the United Kingdom
2010s in Surrey